Foxtrot Zulu is a band based in the Providence, Rhode Island area. They toured the country for several years and recorded four original albums. Guitarist Nate Edmunds is currently a middle school principal in Jamestown, Rhode Island.

Discography 
Moe's Diner (1995)
Burn Slow (1997)
Frozen In Time (1999)
Tonight (2008)
Live album:
Live... (2000)

References 
Footnotes

General references
Relix Magazine Feature; June 1999
Voyager Magazine; 2000

Alternative rock groups from Rhode Island